Daniil Vladimirovich Bessarabov (born 9 July 1976, Novokuznetsk, Kemerovo Oblast) is a Russian political figure and deputy of the 7th and 8th State Duma convocations.

In 1999 Bessarabov graduated from the Altai State University. In 2006, he was awarded a Doctor of Juridical Science degree. From 1999 to 2004 he worked as a lawyer in Barnaul. In 2004, he was elected a deputy of the Altai Regional Council of People's Deputies, running from the Liberal Democratic Party of Russia. Later he joined the United Russia. On September 17, 2010, he was appointed the Deputy Governor of the Altai Territory. Since 2016 he has served as deputy of the  7th (2016-2021) and 8th State Duma (2021-) convocations. 

Daniil Bessarabov is married and has two daughters.

References

1976 births
Living people
People from Novokuznetsk
United Russia politicians
21st-century Russian politicians
Seventh convocation members of the State Duma (Russian Federation)
Eighth convocation members of the State Duma (Russian Federation)